Clive Crook (born 1955 in Yorkshire, England) is a former columnist for the Financial Times and the National Journal; a former senior editor at The Atlantic Monthly, and now writes a column and editorials for Bloomberg News. For twenty years he held various editorial positions at The Economist, including deputy editor from 1993 to 2005.

In 2006, he co-chaired the Copenhagen Consensus project, framing global development priorities for the coming decades. He has co-authored Globalisation: Making Sense of an Integrating World: Reasons, Effects and Challenges for the Economist Group.

Background
He was born in Yorkshire and raised in Lancashire. He was educated at Bolton School, and graduated from Magdalen College, Oxford, and the London School of Economics. He has served as a consultant to The World Bank and worked as an official at Britain's Her Majesty's Treasury.

Publications

References

External links 
 Clive Crook at Bloomberg News
 Clive Crook at The Atlantic Monthly
 Clive Crook's Blog at Financial Times
 Clive Crook interviews at PBS
 

1953 births
Journalists from Yorkshire
People educated at Bolton School
Alumni of Magdalen College, Oxford
Alumni of the London School of Economics
English male journalists
English editors
English columnists
Bloomberg L.P. people
The Atlantic (magazine) people
Financial Times people
The Economist people
Living people